The Saraswati Superclusterhttp://www.iucaa.in/~joydeep/saraswati.html is a massive galaxy supercluster about 1.2 gigaparsecs (4 billion light years) away within the Stripe 82 region of SDSS, in the direction of the constellation Pisces. It is one of the largest structures found in the universe, with a major axis in diameter of about 200 Mpc (652 million light years).

Discovery

The Saraswati supercluster was discovered by a team of astrophysicists from the Inter-University Centre for Astronomy and Astrophysics and Indian Institute of Science Education and Research led by Joydeep Bagchi and colleagues in Pune, India in 2017. Analyzing the data of Stripe 82 of the comprehensive Sloan Digital Sky Survey, particularly the sets of LOWZ data from the Baryon Oscillation Spectroscopic Survey, part of the DR12 catalogue of the SDSS, the team discovered an overdensity of the sampled 625 galaxies from LOWZ and 3,016 from the LEGACY-BOSS-SOUTHERN, a survey of the southern sky that is also a part of SDSS DR12.

Cosmology

The Saraswati Supercluster is one of the largest and most massive superclusters known, comparable to the massive Shapley Concentration in the nearby universe. The supercluster consists of 43 massive galaxy clusters, which include Abell 2361 and ZWCl 2341.1+0000. It is surrounded by a network of galaxy filaments, clusters, and voids.

The Saraswati supercluster and its environs reveal that some extreme large-scale, prominent matter density enhancements had formed in the past when dark energy had just started to dominate structure formation. This galactic concentration sheds light on the role of dark energy and cosmological initial conditions in supercluster formation.

References

Galaxy superclusters
Astronomical objects discovered in 2017